The 1892 Dartmouth football team represented Dartmouth College as a member of the New England Intercollegiate Football Association (NEIFA) the 1892 college football season. Dartmouth compiled an overall record of 5–3 with a mark of 1–1 in NEIFA play.

Schedule

References

Dartmouth
Dartmouth Big Green football seasons
Dartmouth football